John David Hilton (September 15, 1950 – September 17, 2017) was a professional baseball player. He was picked in the 1971 Secondary Draft out of Rice University and played four seasons for the San Diego Padres. He also played three seasons in Japan for the Yakult Swallows and Hanshin Tigers. Hilton was primarily a third baseman, but played several games at second base.

Career
Early in the 1975 season, Hilton contracted hepatitis which caused the San Diego Padres to announce he would be out indefinitely.

Despite a productive career in Japan, particularly with the Swallows, Hilton was the subject of controversy in his 1980 stint with the Hanshin Tigers. The Tigers were managed by American Don Blasingame, who kept the slumping Hilton in the lineup despite the presence of promising rookie Akinobu Okada. The media and Hanshin fans campaigned relentlessly for Hilton to be benched and/or let go, making life miserable for both Hilton and Blasingame. As a result of the controversy, Hilton was released by the team and Blasingame resigned as manager.

Hilton managed the collegiate summer baseball team the Frederick Keys in 1997.

Hilton died September 17, 2017.

In popular culture 
Hilton is credited by famed Japanese author Haruki Murakami as having inspired him, at the age of 29, to become an author.  Murakami had his epiphany as he saw Hilton hit a double, while watching a Yakult Swallows game in Japan.

References

External links

 Dave Hilton at SABR (Baseball BioProject)
Dave Hilton at Baseball Almanac

1950 births
2017 deaths
American expatriate baseball players in Japan
American expatriate baseball players in Mexico
Alexandria Aces players
Baseball players from Texas
Diablos Rojos del México players
Hanshin Tigers players
Hawaii Islanders players
Lodi Padres players
Milwaukee Brewers coaches
Major League Baseball first base coaches
Major League Baseball third basemen
Minor league baseball managers
Nippon Professional Baseball infielders
People from Uvalde, Texas
Portland Beavers players
Rice Owls baseball players
Rice University alumni
San Diego Padres players
St. Lucie Legends players
Sun City Rays players
Toledo Mud Hens players
Yakult Swallows players